Bogomil Nikolaev Raynov was a Bulgarian writer and professor of aesthetics.

Biography 
He was the son of the writer, philosopher and artist academician Nikolay Raynov and the brother of the sculptor Boyan Raynov. He took part in the Resistance Movement during the Second World War. He was a member of several Marxist circles. He became a member of the Bulgarian Communist Party in 1944.

He was the editor-in-chief of the Starling newspaper. For some time he was an associate professor at the Nikolai Pavlovich Higher Institute of Fine Arts.

From 1953 to 1960 he was cultural attaché at the Bulgarian Embassy in Paris, at which time he purchased various works of art exhibited at the National Art Gallery.

He was a member of the Central Committee of the Bulgarian Communist Party beginning in 1976. He was vice-chairman in 1967 and deputy chairman in 1972 of the Union of Bulgarian Communists, and also a corresponding Member of BAS since 1974.

Together with Svetlin Rusev he participated in the selection and purchase of paintings at the National Gallery for Foreign Art. The money was state-owned, granted at the insistence of Lyudmila Zhivkova.

Creativity 
He collaborated with the newspapers Vestnik na Zhenata, Uchenicheski Rise, Svetlostruy, Literary Life, Literary Critic, Art and Criticism magazine and others. His works were first published in 1936 in the Women's Gazette.

He made scientific publications in the fields of aesthetics, art history and culturology. He was the author of numerous monographs on the fine arts, history of theosophy and a series of crime and spy novels, whose main character is Emil Boev, as well as novelized autobiographies. His novels are very popular, published several times in large numbers.

In one of his later books - "Ludmila", he gives interesting information about the backstage in Bulgarian cultural and political life in the 80s of the 20th century and the attempt to break the narrow-mindedness and open the door to the world of free culture.

After the death of Raynov, his books "Our Light Finger" and "Letter from a Dead Man" were published, filled with harsh attacks against Alexander Zhendov, Boris Delchev and Radoi Ralin.

Awards 
Honored Cultural Worker (1965). 
People's Cultural Worker (1971).  
Hero of Socialist Labor (1976). 
Order of Georgi Dimitrov (1952, 1969).
St. Paisius of Hilendar prize (2006).

Criticism 
Bogomil Raynov is a highly controversial figure in Bulgarian culture. As a long-term deputy chairman of the Union of Bulgarian Writers and a member of the Central Committee of the Bulgarian Communist Party, he played a major role in imposing socialist realism in Bulgarian literature and in the ideological defeat of many "ideologically deluded" Bulgarian writers such as Alexander Zhendov, Hristo Radevski, Atanas Dalchev and others, during the early years of communist rule until the fall of Valko Chervenkov, and later.

The famous Bulgarian literary critic Boris Delchev called him in his diary "a scoundrel and high-class polemicist", "cannibal", "the right hand of the cult and its striking force, one of Zhendov's moral assassins". The Bulgarian poet and translator Nevena Stefanova called him a "talented man". Radoi Ralin gave him the famous nickname "Guess Numerainov".

Selected works

Novels and short stories 
The Inspector and the Night (1963)
Roads to Nowhere
Die as a last resort (1978)
There's Nothing Better Than Bad Weather (1971) 
Mr. Nobody (1967, 1971, 1974)
The Great Boredom (1971, 1974)
Brazilian Melody 
A Middle-aged Naive (1975, 1976)
Requiem for a Slut (1975, 1976)
Typhoons with Gentle Names (1977)
The Third Way (1977)
Black Swans (1977)
Only for Men ( 1977, 2003)
The Day Doesn't Show in the Morning (1981)
Don't Make Me Laugh (1983, 1989)
The Quiet Corner (1999)
Second Hand Cops ( 2000)
The Colors of Pain (2004)
The Secret (2005)
Magic Lantern (2005)
The Tobacco Man

Poetry collections 
Verses (1940)
Poems (1941)
Stalin (poem, 1944)
Poems (1949)
Verses (1962)
Love calendar (1942)
City Winds (selected verses, 1969)
Steps on the sand. Verses 1936 - 1986 ”(1989)
Cloudy, Verses (2002)

Essays 
Style in the Fine Arts (Introduction to Stylistics) (1948)
Against the Art of Imperialism (1953)
The Ways of Zionism (1969)
Eros and Thanatos (1971)
Portraits (1975)
In the Name of the Father, Biography
Production House, 2001
Ludmila (2003)
The Secret Doctrine (2003)
Paris

References 

1919 births
2007 deaths
Bulgarian writers
Bulgarian Communist Party politicians
Cultural attachés